The 2018 United States House of Representatives election in Vermont was held on November 6, 2018, to elect the U.S. representative from the state of Vermont from Vermont's at-large congressional district. The election coincided with other elections to the House of Representatives, elections to the United States Senate and various state and local elections. The primary elections were held on August 14. Peter Welch, a Democrat won reelection to a seventh term, defeating Republican Anya Tynio.

Democratic primary

Candidates

Declared
 Daniel Freilich, candidate for U.S. Senate in 2010, Navy medical doctor, physician at the VA Medical Center
 Peter Welch, incumbent U.S. Representative

Withdrawn
 Ben Mitchell, Liberty Union nominee for U.S. Senate in 2004, Governor of Vermont in 2010 and for Lieutenant Governor of Vermont in 2012 (Withdrew 8/9/2018, endorsed Freilich)

Debates & forums
 CCTV Channel 17 Forum - Democratic Primary for Representative to Congress 8/7/2018
 Vermont Public Radio - Campaign 2018: A Debate With The Democratic Candidates For U.S. House 8/9/2018

Results

Republican primary

Candidates

Declared
 H. Brooke Paige, former CEO of Remmington News Service, perennial candidate
 Anya Tynio, sales representative for the Newport Daily Express

Debates & forums
 CCTV Channel 17 Republican Primary Forum for Representative to Congress 7/23/2018

Results

Post-primary
H. Brooke Paige, who also won the Republican nominations for U.S. Senate, state Attorney General, state Secretary of State, state Treasurer and state Auditor, withdrew from all but the Secretary of State race on August 24 in order to allow the Vermont Republican State Committee to name replacement candidates. Anya Tynio, who came in 2nd place in the primary, was nominated to be the Republican nominee.

Progressive primary

Candidates

Write-in
 Daniel Freilich, candidate for U.S. Senate in 2010, Navy medical doctor, physician at the VA Medical Center (also running in Democratic primary)

Debates & forums
 BCTV Meet The Candidates forum for Representative to US House 7/10/2018

Results

Liberty Union/Socialist nomination
The Liberty Union Party serves as the Vermont affiliate of the Socialist Party for federal-level elections.

Candidates

Declared
 Laura S. Potter

Withdrawn
 Ben Mitchell, Liberty Union nominee for U.S. Senate in 2004, Governor of Vermont in 2010 and for Lieutenant Governor of Vermont in 2012 (also ran in Democratic primary before dropping out)

United States Marijuana nomination

Candidates

Declared
 Cris Ericson, perennial candidate

America First nomination

Candidates

Declared
 Paul Young (failed to appear on ballot)

General election

Polling

Results

References

External links
Candidates at Vote Smart 
Candidates at Ballotpedia 
Campaign finance at FEC 
Campaign finance at OpenSecrets

Official campaign websites
Cris Ericson (M) for Congress 
Daniel Freilich (P/D) for Congress
Ben Mitchell (S/D) for Congress
Anya Tynio (R) for Congress 
Peter Welch (D) for Congress

2018
Vermont
United States House of Representatives